The Trofeo Jaumendreu was a road bicycle race held annually in Catalonia, Spain from 1945 until 1969. From 1963 to 1969, the race took place as a stage in the Setmana Catalana de Ciclisme.

Winners

References

Cycle races in Spain
Recurring sporting events established in 1945
1945 establishments in Spain
Cycle races in Catalonia
1969 disestablishments in Spain
Defunct cycling races in Spain
Recurring sporting events disestablished in 1969